Rosetta is a village in Mpofana Local Municipality in the KwaZulu-Natal province of South Africa.

Rosetta is known for the case of Elizabeth Klarer, who in 1955 claimed to have been abducted by aliens on a hill outside the town.

References

Populated places in the Mpofana Local Municipality